The  Rally for Democracy and Economic and Social Development (RADDES) is a small, predominantly ethnic Tutsi political party in Burundi.

History
The party supported losing candidate Pierre Buyoya of the Union for National Progress in the 1993 presidential elections. In the parliamentary elections later in the year, RADDES received 1.3% of the vote, failing to win a seat.

References

Political parties in Burundi